Pablo Silva de Lara (born 21 April 1999), commonly known as Pablo Pardal, is a Brazilian footballer who currently plays as a midfielder for FC Cascavel, on loan from Sport Recife.

Career statistics

Club

Notes

References

External links

1999 births
Living people
Brazilian footballers
Brazil youth international footballers
Association football midfielders
Campeonato Brasileiro Série A players
Sport Club do Recife players